Armando Alba Zambrana (9 February 1901 – 10 October 1974) was a Bolivian writer, journalist, historian and politician from Potosí. He won the Premio Nacional de Cultura in 1969. He was an important member of Gesta Bárbara and founded the Editorial Potosí group of writers. During the administration of President Enrique Hertzog, Alba was appointed Minister of Education and Indigenous Affairs. He was also the Bank Secretary of Potosí and the 100th anniversary of birth was celebrated in 2001.

Works
Voces áulicas (poetry, 1918).
Temple de la montaña y otros cuentos (stories, 1926).
Imagen de Potosí y de su Casa Real de Moneda (essays, 1946).
Enumeración del Proceso Potosino y "Gesta Bárbara" (essays, 1946).
Del viejo hontanar (poetry, 1970).
Bolívar (anthology, 1970).
Prólogos escogidos (2001).
Imagen de Potosí (2001).

References

Bibliography 

 

1901 births
1974 deaths
People from Potosí
Bolivian male writers
Bolivian journalists
Male journalists
20th-century Bolivian historians
20th-century male writers
20th-century journalists
20th-century Bolivian politicians
Education ministers of Bolivia